Gino Romiti (1881–1967) was an Italian painter, active in Livorno.

Biography
He was born in Livorno, and trained under Guglielmo Micheli, along with Manlio Martinelli, Llewelyn Lloyd, Amedeo Modigliani, and Aristide Sommati. In 1898, he exhibited at the Permanente di Milano nel 1898, and at the Venetian Esposizione d’Arte in 1908 and 1912, returning to the Biennale in 1952. A member of the Gruppo Labronico of painters that met in the Caffè Bardi, he decorated the meeting room with a canvas of the Birth of Venus. Among the painters of the group, he had affinities with Symbolist styles of the times, depicting some underwater marine subjects.

The Gruppo Labronico was founded in his studio on July 15, 1920. He was president of the group from 1946 until its closing.

References

19th-century Italian painters
Italian male painters
20th-century Italian painters
People from Livorno
Painters from Tuscany
1881 births
1967 deaths
19th-century Italian male artists
20th-century Italian male artists

Gruppo Labronico